Laaghalen is a hamlet in the Dutch province of Drenthe. It is a part of the municipality of Midden-Drenthe, about 9 km south of Assen.

The statistical area "Laaghalen", which can also include the surrounding countryside, has a population of around 90.

References

Midden-Drenthe
Populated places in Drenthe